Fabio Santos may refer to:
 Fábio Santos (fighter) (born 1956), Brazilian jiu-jitsu practitioner
 Fábio dos Santos Barbosa, born 1980, Brazilian football midfielder
 Fábio Santos Romeu, born 1985, Brazilian football left wingback
 José Fábio Santos de Oliveira, born 1987, Brazilian football striker
 Fábio Manuel Matos dos Santos, born 1988, Portugal footballer defender
 Fábio Alexandre Barbosa Santos, born 1992, Portugal football goalkeeper
 Fábio de Jesus Carmo Santos, born 1994, Portugal football defender
 Fábio Alexandre Jesus Santos, born 1998, Portugal football defender